E-M215, also known as E1b1b and formerly E3b, is a major human Y-chromosome DNA haplogroup. It is a division of the macro-haplogroup E-M96, which is defined by the single-nucleotide polymorphism (SNP) mutation M215. In other words, it is one of the major patrilineages of humanity, linking from father-to-son back to a common male-line ancestor ("Y-chromosomal Adam"). It is a subject of discussion and study in genetics as well as genetic genealogy, archaeology, and historical linguistics.

The E-M215 haplogroup has two ancient branches that contain all the known modern E-M215, E-M35 and E-M281 subclades. Of the latter two E-M215 subhaplogroups, the only branch that has been confirmed in a native population outside of Ethiopia is E-M35. E-M35 in turn has two known branches, E-V68 and E-Z827, which contain by far the majority of all modern E-M215 subclade bearers. The E-V257 and E-V68 subclades each respectively their highest frequencies in North Africa and the Horn of Africa, and also at lower percentages in parts of the Middle East and Europe, and in isolated populations of Southern Africa.

Origins

The origins of E-M215 were dated by Cruciani in 2007 to about 22,400 years ago in the Horn of Africa. E-M35 was dated by Batini in 2015 to between 15,400 and 20,500 years ago. In June 2015, Trombetta et al. reported a previously unappreciated large difference in the age between haplogroup E-M215 (38.6 kya; 95% CI 31.4–45.9 kya) and its sub-haplogroup E-M35 (25.0 kya; 95% CI 20.0–30.0 kya) and estimated its origin to be in Northeast Africa, where the node separating the E-V38 and E-M215 branches occurs about 47,500 years ago (95% CI: 41.3–56.8 ka).

 All major sub-branches of E-M35 are thought to have originated in the same general area as the parent clade: in North Africa, the Horn of Africa, or nearby areas of the Near East. Some branches of E-M35 are assumed to have left Africa thousands of years ago, whereas others may have arrived from the Near East. For example,  associates the spread of the haplogroup with the Neolithic Revolution, believing that the structure and regional pattern of E-M35 subclades potentially give "reagents with which to infer specific episodes of population histories associated with the Neolithic agricultural expansion".  also estimate that E-M78 (called E1b1b1a1 in that paper) has been in Europe longer than 10,000 years. Accordingly, human remains excavated in a Spanish funeral cave dating from approximately 7,000 years ago were shown to be in this haplogroup. Two more E-M78 have been found in the Neolithic Sopot and Lengyel cultures too.

Concerning E-M35 in Europe within this scheme,  have remarked that E-M215 seems to represent a late-Pleistocene migration from North Africa to Europe over the Sinai Peninsula in Egypt. While this proposal remains uncontested, it has more recently been proposed by  that there is also evidence for additional migration of E-M215 carrying men directly from North Africa to southwestern Europe, via a maritime route (see below.)

According to Lazaridis et al. (2016), Natufian skeletal remains from the ancient Levant predominantly carried the Y-DNA haplogroup E1b1b. Of the five Natufian specimens analysed for paternal lineages, three belonged to the E1b1b1b2(xE1b1b1b2a,E1b1b1b2b), E1b1(xE1b1a1,E1b1b1b1) and E1b1b1b2(xE1b1b1b2a,E1b1b1b2b) subclades (60%). Haplogroup E1b1b was also found at moderate frequencies among fossils from the ensuing Pre-Pottery Neolithic B culture, with the E1b1b1 and E1b1b1b2(xE1b1b1b2a,E1b1b1b2b) subclades observed in two of seven PPNB specimens (~29%). The scientists suggest that the Levantine early farmers may have spread southward into East Africa, bringing along Western Eurasian and Basal Eurasian ancestral components separate from that which would arrive later in North Africa.

Additionally, haplogroup E1b1b1 has been found in an ancient Egyptian mummy excavated at the Abusir el-Meleq archaeological site in Middle Egypt, which dates from a period between the late New Kingdom and the Roman era. Fossils at the Iberomaurusian site of Ifri n'Amr or Moussa in Morocco, which have been dated to around 5,000 BCE, also carried haplotypes related to the E1b1b1b1a (E-M81) subclade. These ancient individuals bore an autochthonous Maghrebi genomic component that peaks among modern North Africans, indicating that they were ancestral to populations in the area. The E1b1b haplogroup has likewise been observed in ancient Guanche fossils excavated in Gran Canaria and Tenerife on the Canary Islands, which have been radiocarbon-dated to between the 7th and 11th centuries CE. The clade-bearing individuals that were analysed for paternal DNA were inhumed at the Tenerife site, with all of these specimens found to belong to the E1b1b1b1a1 or E-M183 subclade (3/3; 100%).

Loosdrecht et al. (2018) analysed genome-wide data from seven ancient Iberomaurusian individuals from the Grotte des Pigeons near Taforalt in eastern Morocco. The fossils were directly dated to between 15,100 and 13,900 calibrated years before present. The scientists found that five male specimens with sufficient nuclear DNA preservation belonged to the E1b1b1a1 (M78) subclade, with one skeleton bearing the E1b1b1a1b1 parent lineage to E-V13, another male specimen belonged to E1b1b (M215*).

Distribution
In Africa, E-M215 is distributed in highest frequencies in the Horn of Africa and North Africa, specifically in the countries Somalia and Morocco, whence it has in recent millennia expanded as far south as South Africa, and northwards into Western Asia and Europe (especially the Mediterranean and the Balkans).

Almost all E-M215 men are also in E-M35. In 2004, M215 was found to be older than M35 when individuals were found who have the M215 mutation, but do not have M35 mutation.
In 2013, one individual in Khorasan, North-East Iran, was found by Di Cristofaro et al. (2013) to be positive for M215 but negative for M35.

E-M215 and E-M35 are quite common among Afroasiatic speakers. The linguistic group and carriers of E-M35 lineage have a high probability to have arisen and dispersed together from the Afroasiatic Urheimat. Amongst populations with an Afro-Asiatic speaking history, a significant proportion of Jewish male lineages are E-M35. Haplogroup E-M35, which accounts for approximately 18% to 20% of Ashkenazi and 8.6% to 30% of Sephardi Y-chromosomes, appears to be one of the major founding lineages of the Jewish population.

The following table only includes sample populations with more than 1% E-M215 men with all known subclades as of June 2015. It contains the E-V1515 clade defined by Trombetta et al. 2015, and all the E1b1b subclades distributed below the Sahara (E-V42,  E-M293,  E-V92,  E-V6), which were identified as E-M35 basal clades in a former phylogeny.

E-M215 association with endurance
Moran et al. (2004) observed that among Y-DNA (paternal) clades borne by elite endurance athletes in Ethiopia, the haplogroup E3b1 was negatively correlated with elite athletic endurance performance, whereas the haplogroups E*, E3*, K*(xP), and J*(xJ2) were significantly more frequent among the elite endurance athletes.

Subclades of E-M215
Cladogram with the main subclades:

Family tree
The following phylogenetic tree is based on the YCC 2008 tree and subsequent published research as summarized by ISOGG. It includes all known subclades as of June 2015 (Trombetta et al. 2015)

E-M215 (E1b1b) 
E-M215*. Rare or non-existent.
E-M35 (E1b1b1) 
E-V68 (E1b1b1a)
E-V2009. Found in individuals in Sardinia and Morocco.
E-M78 (E1b1b1a1). North Africa, Horn of Africa, West Asia, Sicily. (Formerly "E1b1b1a".)
E-M78* 
E-V1477. Found in Tunisian Jews.
E-V1083. 
E-V1083*. Found only in Eritrea (1.1%) and Sardinia (0.3%).
E-V13
E-V22
E-V1129
E-V12
E-V12*
E-V32
E-V264
E-V259. Found in North Cameroon.
E-V65
E-CTS194
E-Z827 (E1b1b1b)
E-V257/L19 (L19, V257) – E1b1b1b1
E-PF2431 
E-M81 (M81)
E-PF2546
E-PF2546*
E-CTS12227
E-MZ11
E-MZ12
E-A929
E-Z5009
E-Z5009*
E-Z5010
E-Z5013
E-Z5013*
E-A1152
E-A2227
E-A428
E-MZ16
E-PF6794
E-PF6794*
E-PF6789
E-MZ21
E-MZ23
E-MZ80
E-A930
E-Z2198/E-MZ46
E-A601
E-L351
E-Z830 (Z830) – E1b1b1b2
E-M123 (M123)
E-M34 (M34)
E-M84 (M84)
E-M136 (M136)
E-M290 (M290)
E-V23 (V23)
E-L791 (L791,L792)
E-V1515. E-V1515 and its subclades are mainly restricted to eastern Africa.
E-V1515* 
E-V1486 
E-V1486* 
E-V2881 
E-V2881* 
E-V1792 
E-V92 
E-M293 (M293)
E-M293* 
E-P72 (P72)
E-V3065* 
E-V1700
E-V42 (V42)
E-V1785
E-V1785*
E-V6 (V6)
E-V16/E-M281 (E1b1b2). Rare. Found in individuals in Ethiopia, Yemen and Saudi Arabia.

Exceptional cases of men who are M215 positive but M35 negative ("E-M215*") have been discovered so far in two Amharas of Ethiopia and one Yemeni. At least some of these men, perhaps all, are known since early 2011 to be in a rare sibling clade to E-M35, known as E-V16 or E-M281. It was in the 2011 paper that the family tree position (M215+/M35-) was discovered as described above.
The E-M215 derivative, E-M35 is defined by the M35 SNP. 1 Turkmen individual from Jawzjan with a subclade defining mutation is referred to as E-M35*. As of June 2015, there is an increasingly complex tree structure which divides most men in E-M35 into two branches: E-V68 and E-Z827.

The most frequently described subclades are E-M78, a part of E-V68, and E-M81, which is a branch of E-Z827. These two subclades represent the largest proportion of the modern E-M215 population. E-M78 is found over most of the range where E-M215 is found excluding Southern Africa. E-M81 is found mainly in North Africa. E-M123 is less common but widely scattered, with significant populations in specific parts of the Horn of Africa, the Levant, Arabia, Iberia, and Anatolia. A new clade (E-V1515) was defined by Trombetta et al. 2015, which originated about 12 kya (95% CI 8.6–16.4) in eastern Africa where it is currently mainly distributed. This clade includes the E-V42, E-M293, E-V92 and E-V6 subclades, which were identified as E-M35 basal clades in a previous phylogeny.

TMRCA of the major nodes in E-M215

E-V68 (E1b1b1a)

E-V68, is dominated by its longer-known subclade E-M78. The authors noted that because E-V68* was not found in the Middle Eastern samples, this appears to be evidence of maritime migration from Africa to southwestern Europe.
E-M78 is a commonly occurring subclade, widely distributed in North Africa, the Horn of Africa, West Asia, (the Middle East and Near East) "up to Southern Asia", and all of Europe. The European distribution has a frequency peak centered in parts of the Balkans (up to almost 50% in some areas) and Sicily, and declining frequencies evident toward western, central, and northeastern Europe.

Based on genetic STR variance data,  suggests that E-M78 originated in the region of Egypt and Libya. about 18,600 years ago (17,300 – 20,000 years ago).  describe Egypt as "a hub for the distribution of the various geographically localized M78-related subclades" and, based on archaeological data, they propose that the point of origin of E-M78 (as opposed to later dispersal from Egypt) may have been in a refugium which "existed on the border of present-day Sudan and Egypt, near Lake Nubia, until the onset of a humid phase around 8500 BC. The northward-moving rainfall belts during this period could have also spurred a rapid migration of Mesolithic foragers northwards in Africa, the Levant and ultimately onward to Asia Minor and Europe, where they each eventually differentiated into their regionally distinctive branches". Towards the south,  also explain evidence that some subclades of E-M78, specifically E-V12 and E-V22, "might have been brought to Sudan from North Africa after the progressive desertification of the Sahara around 6,000–8,000 years ago". And similarly,  propose that E-M78 in Ethiopia, Somalia and surrounding areas, back-migrated to this region from the direction of Egypt after acquiring the E-M78 mutation.

Recently, E-M78 was dated by Trombetta et al. 2015. between 20,300 and 14,800 years ago.

Subclades of E-M78
Listed here are the main subclades of M78 as of June 2015. Within the E-M78 subclade, Trombetta et al. 2015 allocated most of the former E-M78* chromosomes to three new distinct branches: E-V1083*, E-V1477 and E-V259. The first is a paragroup sister to clades E-V22 and E-V13. The mutation V1477 defines a new basal branch that has been observed only in one northern African sample. Finally, a sister clade of E-V12 defined by V264 includes E-V65 and V259, a new lineage distributed in central Africa.

E-M78 (E1b1b1a1) North Africa, Horn of Africa, West Asia, Europe (formerly "E1b1b1a").
E-M78* Found in Morocco, southern Portugal, southern Spain and Iran (Tehran and Semnan provinces).
E-V1477 Found in Tunisian Jews.
E-V1083 
E-V1083* Found only in Eritrea (1.1%) and Sardinia (0.3%).
E-V13 This is the most common subclade of E-M215 found in Europe. It is especially common in the Balkans.
E-V22. Concentrated in Northeast Africa and the Near East. Peaks among the Saho.
E-V1129
E-V12. Found in Egypt, Sudan, and Chad other places. Has an important subclade
E-V12* Most common lineage among Southern Egyptians (74.5%).
E-V32. Very common among Somalis, Tigre and Oromos.
E-V264
E-V259 Found in North Cameroon.
E-V65 Associated with North Africa, but also found in Sicily and also found in continental Italy.
E-M521 Not mentioned by Trombetta et al.2015. (2013)

E-Z827 (E1b1b1b)

In human genetics, E-Z827, is the name of a major human Y-chromosome DNA haplogroup abundantly found in North Africa, particularly the Maghreb, and to a lesser extent in Horn of Africa, the Near East and Europe.

E-V257/E-L19 (E1b1b1b1)
E-V257* individuals in their samples who were E-V257, but not E-M81. A Borana from Kenya, a Marrakesh Berber, a Corsican, a Sardinian, a southern Spaniard and a Cantabrian. As mentioned above,  propose that the absence of E-V257* in the Middle East (Yfull found a young one in Iranian Azerbaijan and a different young one in Armenia) makes a maritime movement from northern Africa to southern Europe the most plausible hypothesis so far to explain its distribution. Yfull lists 24 individuals, all of whom belong to a single branch that is 30% younger than their common ancestor with M81.

E-M81
E-M81 is the most common subclade of haplogroup E-L19/V257. It is concentrated in the Maghreb, and is dominated by its E-M183 subclade. E-M183 is believed to have originated in the Northwest Africa and has an estimated age of 4700 ybp.

This haplogroup reaches a mean frequency of 61% in the Maghreb and  51% in North Africa, decreasing in frequency from approximately 80% to 100% in Berber populations, including Saharawis, to approximately 29% to the east of this range in Egypt. Because of its young age and prevalence among these groups and also others such as Mozabite, Middle Atlas, Kabyle and other Berber groups, it is sometimes referred to as a genetic "Berber marker".  report high levels amongst Tuareg in two Saharan populations – 77.8% near Gorom-Gorom, in Burkina Faso, and 81.8% from Gosi in Mali. There was a much lower frequency of 11.1% in the vicinity of Tanut in Niger. E-M81 is also quite common among Maghrebi Arabic-speaking groups. It is generally found at frequencies around 45% in coastal cities of Algeria and Tunisia (Jijel, Oran, Tizi Ouzou, Algiers, Tunis, Sousse).

In this key area from Egypt to the Atlantic Ocean,   report a M183-SM001 pattern of decreasing microsatellite haplotype variation (implying greater lineage age in the former areas) from the Reguibat tribe in Oran and they found M183* (not SM001) in Iberia, Libya and Morocco.  however showed microsatellite variation decrease from East to West, accompanied by a substantial increasing frequency. At the eastern extreme of this core range,  found M81 in 28.6% (10 out of 35 men) in el-Hayez in the Libyan Desert in Egypt.

 believe the pattern of distribution and variance to be consistent with the hypothesis of a "demic diffusion" from the East. There is no autochthonous presence of E-M81 in the Near East (there is one in Lebanon), indicating that M81 most likely emerged from its parent clade M35 either in North Africa, or possibly as far south as the Horn of Africa.

In Europe, E-M81 is widespread but rare, in the Iberian Peninsula shows an average frequency of 4% (45/1140) in the Iberian Peninsula with frequencies reaching 3.5% in Galicia, 4% in Western Andalusia and Northwest Castile. However this study includes 153 individuals from Majorca, Minorca and Ibiza islands as well as 24 individuals from Gascony which are not in the Iberian Peninsula. Without these 177 individuals, average for Iberian Peninsula is 4.1% (40/963), it is found at comparable levels to E-M78, with an average frequency of around 5%. Its frequencies are higher in the western half of the peninsula with frequencies reaching 8% in Extremadura and southern Portugal, 4% to 5%  in Galicia, 5% in western Andalusia and 4% in northwest Castile and 9% to 17% in Cantabria. The highest frequencies of this clade found so far in Europe were observed in the Valles Pasiegos from Cantabria, ranging from 5.5% (8/45) to 41% (23/56). An average frequency of 8.28% (54/652) has also been reported in the Spanish Canary Islands with frequencies over 10% in the three largest islands of Tenerife (10.68%), Gran Canaria (11.54%) and Fuerteventura (13.33%).

E-M81 is also found in France, 2.70% (15/555) overall with frequencies surpassing 5% in Auvergne (5/89) and Île-de-France (5/91), 0,7% to 5,8% in Sardinia, approximately 2.12% overall in Sicily (but up to 7.14% in Piazza Armerina), and in very much lower frequency near Lucera (1.7%), in continental Italy, possibly due to ancient migrations during the Islamic, Roman, and Carthaginian empires. In a 2014 study by Stefania Sarno et al. with 326 samples from Cosenza, Reggio Calabria, Lecce and five Sicilian provinces, E-M81 shows an average frequency of 1.53%, but the typical Maghrebin core haplotype 13-14-30-24-9-11-13 has been found in only two out of the five E-M81 individuals. These results, along with the negligible contribution from North-African populations revealed by the admixture-like plot analysis, suggest only a marginal impact of trans-Mediterranean gene flows on the current SSI genetic pool.

As a result of its old world distribution, this subclade is found throughout Brasil 5.4% in Brazil (Rio de Janeiro), and among Hispanic men from California and Hawaii 2.4%.

In smaller numbers, E-M81 men can be found in areas in contact with North Africa, both around the Sahara, in places like Sudan, and around the Mediterranean in places like Lebanon, Turkey, and amongst Sephardi Jews.

There are two recognized subclades of E-M81, although one is much more important than the other.

The E-M81 subclade has been found in ancient Guanche (Bimbapes) fossils excavated in Punta Azul, El Hierro, Canary Islands, which are dated to the 10th century (~44%).

E-M107
 found one example of E-M107 in Mali.

E-M183
E-M183 is extremely dominant (more than 99%) within E-M81.  first described it as a subclade of E-M81.
The known subclades of E-M183 include:
E-M165  found one example in Middle East.
E-L351 Found in two related participants in The E-M35 Phylogeny Project.

E-Z830 (E1b1b1b2)
This is a recently discovered subclade which has not yet been included in most haplogroup trees, E-Z830 includes the confirmed subclades of E-M123, E-V1515 (E-M293, E-V42, E-V6, E-V92), and E-Z830*, and is a sibling clade to E-L19. Currently,  the E-M35 phylogeny project] recognizes four distinct clusters of Z830* carriers, two of which are exclusively Jewish in origin. The remaining two are significantly smaller, and include scattered individuals in Germany, Spain, Latin America, Egypt, and Ethiopia.

E-M123

E-M123 is mostly known for its major subclade E-M34, which dominates this clade.

E-V1515
A new clade (E-V1515) was defined by Trombetta et al. 2015, which originated about 12 kya (95% CI 8.6–16.4) in eastern Africa where it is currently mainly distributed.  This clade includes all the sub-Saharan haplogroups (E-V42,  E-M293,  E-V92,  E-V6)  reported as E-M35 basal clades in a  previous phylogeny.

E-M293
E-M293 is a subclade of E-V1515. It was first identified by ISOGG as the second clade within E-Z830. So far high levels have been found in specific ethnic groups in Tanzania and Southern Africa. Highest were the Datooga (43%), Khwe (Kxoe) (31%), Burunge (28%), and Sandawe peoples (24%). Henn (2008) in their study also found two Bantu-speaking Kenyan males with the M293 mutation.

Other E-M215 subclades are rare in Southern Africa. The authors state "Without information about M293 in the Maasai, Hema, and other populations in Kenya, Sudan, and Ethiopia, we cannot pinpoint the precise geographic source of M293 with greater confidence. However, the available evidence points to present-day Tanzania as an early and important geographic locus of M293 evolution.". They also say that "M293 is only found in sub-Saharan Africa, indicating a separate phylogenetic history for M35.1 * (former) samples further north".

E-P72 appears in Karafet (2008).  announced that this is a subclade of E-M293.

E-V42
 announced the discovery of E-V42 in two Beta Israel persons. It was suggested that it may be restricted to the region around Ethiopia. However, further testing by commercial DNA testing companies confirmed many positive results for this subclade in Saudi Arabia, Kuwait and one person in Portugal who has a root from Arabia.

E-V6
The E-V6 subclade of E-V1515 is defined by V6.  identified a significant presence of these lineages in Ethiopia and also some in the neighboring Somalis. Among the Ethiopian and Somali samples, the highest were 14.7% among the Amhara and 16.7% among the Wolayta.

To the south,  identified one V6+ man in a sample of 35 Datooga of Tanzania. And further to the north,  identified another 6 men in a sample of 93 from the Siwa Oasis, which is a Berber population

E-V92
 announced the discovery of E-V92 in two Amharas. Like E-V6 and E-V42 it possibly only exists in the area of Ethiopia.

Phylogenetics

Phylogenetic history

Prior to 2002, there were in academic literature at least seven naming systems for the Y-Chromosome phylogenetic tree. This led to considerable confusion. In 2002, the major research groups came together and formed the Y-Chromosome Consortium (YCC). They published a joint paper that created a single new tree that all agreed to use. Later, a group of citizen scientists with an interest in population genetics and genetic genealogy formed a working group to create an amateur tree aiming at being above all timely.  The table below brings together all of these works at the point of the landmark 2002 YCC Tree. This allows a researcher reviewing older published literature to quickly move between nomenclatures.

Research publications
The following research teams per their publications were represented in the creation of the YCC Tree.

Discussion 

E-M215 and E1b1b1 are the currently accepted names found in the proposals of the Y Chromosome Consortium (YCC), for the clades defined by mutation M215 and M35 respectively, which can also be referred to as E-M215 and E-M35. The nomenclature E3b (E-M215) and E3b1 (E-M35) respectively were the YCC defined names used to designate the same haplogroups in older literature with E-M35 branching as a separate subclade of E-M215 in 2004. Prior to 2002 these haplogroups were not designated in a consistent way, and nor was their relationship to other related clades within haplogroup E and haplogroup DE.

See also

Genetics

Y-DNA E subclades

Y-DNA backbone tree

Notes

References

Additional sources

. Also at http://www.ucl.ac.uk/tcga/tcgapdf/Behar-AJHG-03.pdf and https://web.archive.org/web/20090304100321/http://www.familytreedna.com/pdf/400971.pdf

 also at 

 Also see Supplementary Data.

 

. See comment on Dienekes blog, comment on the Spitoon blog and public release.

. Published online April 2, 2008. See also Supplementary Material.

. (Also see Errata)

.
 Pontikos D. "Phylogeographic refinement of haplogroup E" http://dienekes.blogspot.ru/2015/07/phylogeographic-refinement-of.html

 

. Published online 9 March 2005

.

 

 Trombetta B. "Phylogeographic Refinement and Large Scale Genotyping of Human Y Chromosome Haplogroup E Provide New Insights into the Dispersal of Early Pastoralists in the African Continent" http://gbe.oxfordjournals.org/content/7/7/1940.long

.

Sources for conversion tables
÷

External links
E-M35 Phylogeny Project Wiki
E-M35 Phylogeny Project (all labs site)
E-M35 Phylogeny Project Public Forum
Jewish E3b Project at FTDNA
Map of E-M35 distribution in Europe
Haplogroup E3B1 (E1b1b1) Facebook Group (M35 community)
E1b1b1b*-A Project
E1b1.org – International Y-DNA project of Haplogroup E1b1 and its Subclades

E1b1b
Mediterranean